Cymindis capito is a species of ground beetle in the subfamily Harpalinae. It was described by Kryzhanovskij & Emetz in 1973.

References

capito
Beetles described in 1973